John Allen Astin (born March 30, 1930) is an American actor and director who has appeared in numerous stage, television and film roles, primarily in character roles. He is best known for starring in The Addams Family (1964–1966), as patriarch Gomez Addams, reprising the role in the television film Halloween with the New Addams Family (1977) and the animated series The Addams Family (1992–1993). With the death of Lisa Loring on January 28, 2023, Astin is the last surviving main cast member of The Addams Family.

Astin starred in the TV film Evil Roy Slade (1972). Other notable film roles include West Side Story (1961), That Touch of Mink (1962), Move Over, Darling (1963), Freaky Friday (1976), National Lampoon's European Vacation (1985), Teen Wolf Too (1987) and The Frighteners (1996). Astin was nominated for the Academy Award for Best Live Action Short Film for his directorial debut, the comedic short Prelude (1968).

Astin has been married three times. His second wife was actress Patty Duke, and Astin is the adoptive father of Duke's son, actor Sean Astin.

Early years
Astin was born in Baltimore, Maryland, to Margaret Linnie (née Mackenzie) and Dr. Allen Varley Astin, who was the director of the National Bureau of Standards (now the National Institute of Standards and Technology). At that time, Astin and his family resided on Battery Lane in Bethesda, Maryland. He graduated from Johns Hopkins University in 1952, after transferring from Washington & Jefferson College. He studied mathematics at Washington & Jefferson and then drama at Johns Hopkins; he was a member of the Phi Kappa Psi fraternity at Johns Hopkins.

Career
Astin started his performing career in theater, making his first Broadway appearance as an understudy in Major Barbara, in 1954 and also did voice-over work for commercials. His first big break in film came with a small role in West Side Story (1961).

During this period, his talent for also playing comedy was spotted by actor Tony Randall, leading to guest starring roles on the sitcom Dennis the Menace, starring Jay North; The Donna Reed Show; and Harrigan and Son, starring Pat O'Brien, the first show broadcast on CBS and the latter two shows broadcast on ABC. In 1961, Astin appeared in the final episode of the ABC police drama The Asphalt Jungle.

During the 1962–63 television season, Astin had his first lead in a television series, the ABC sitcom I'm Dickens, He's Fenster, co-starring with Marty Ingels. Astin played Harry Dickens to Ingels's Arch Fenster, as two trouble-prone carpenters. The series combined witty dialogue with moments of slapstick comedy. I'm Dickens, He's Fenster received critical raves, but was against two high-rated shows, Sing Along with Mitch on NBC and Route 66 on CBS. By the time I'm Dickens, He's Fenster gained a following and started winning its time slot, ABC had already canceled the show. A total of 32 episodes were produced.

Astin is perhaps best known for The Addams Family, a popular sitcom that ran on ABC from 1964 to 1966, based on cartoons created by Charles Addams. Astin starred as Gomez Addams, the head of the macabre family. He later reprised the role of Gomez in the 1977 made-for-television film Halloween with the New Addams Family and voiced the role of Gomez in the animated series The Addams Family from 1992 to 1993. In the Canadian-American television series The New Addams Family, which ran from 1998 to 1999, Astin appeared as Grandpapa Addams, with the role of Gomez played by Glenn Taranto. With the death of Lisa Loring, who played Wednesday, in January 2023, Astin is the last surviving cast member of The Addams Family.

Astin joined the retooled The Pruitts of Southampton (re-titled The Phyllis Diller Show) for the second half of the 1966–67 season, playing Diller's brother-in-law, Angus Pruitt. He also played the Riddler in the second season of Batman (Frank Gorshin returned for the third and final season.) He played submarine commander Matthew Sherman on the 1970s television series Operation Petticoat. He also made several appearances in the first two seasons of the popular mystery series Murder, She Wrote, as scheming real estate developer (and finally Sheriff) Harry Pierce, who ends up as the murderer in his last episode. He had a recurring role on the sitcom Night Court as Buddy, eccentric former mental patient and the father of lead character Harry Stone, who often ended his conversations with a big smile and the phrase,"...but I'm feeling MUCH better now!". Astin played the regular role of Ed LaSalle on the short-lived Mary Tyler Moore sitcom Mary during the 1985–86 television season. He also guest starred on numerous television series, including appearances on Duckman, Homeboys in Outer Space, Jack Palance's ABC circus drama The Greatest Show on Earth, and a 1967 episode of Gunsmoke as Festus Haggen's cousin Henry.

Astin received an Academy Award nomination for Prelude, a short film that he wrote, produced, and directed. He was nominated for an Ace Award for his work on Tales from the Crypt, and received an Emmy Award nomination for the cartoon voice of Gomez on ABC-TV's The Addams Family. He also voiced the character Bull Gator on the animated series Taz-Mania. Astin served for four years on the board of directors of the Writers Guild of America, and has been active in community affairs in Los Angeles and Santa Monica.

Astin has continued to work in acting, appearing in a string of Killer Tomatoes films as Professor Gangreen and as Professor Wickwire in The Adventures of Brisco County, Jr.. In 1996 he featured as The Judge, the ghost of an Old West gunslinger, in Peter Jackson's The Frighteners. He also has toured the one-man play Edgar Allan Poe: Once Upon a Midnight, written by Paul Day Clemens and Ron Magid. In a December 2007 Baltimore Examiner interview, Astin said of his acting experience: 

Astin is a member of the board of directors of the Columbia Center for Theatrical Arts in Columbia, Maryland.

Teaching

Until his retirement in 2021, Astin was director of the Theater Arts and Studies Department and Homewood Professor of the Arts at Johns Hopkins University, his alma mater, which offers an undergraduate minor program. Commenting on his dual career, he said in 2007, "I don't know one major university that has a known actor teaching every day." Astin noted that he is one of only a handful to earn a drama degree from Hopkins. He taught at Hopkins from 2001 until 2021. Devika Bhise has been working with the university to create "The Astin Fund", an endowed chair that would allow theater to be a major at Johns Hopkins University for undergraduates.

Personal life
Astin has five sons; three (David, Allen, and Tom) with his first wife, Suzanne Hahn; two with his second wife, actress Patty Duke – one adopted (Sean, Patty's son from an earlier relationship, whom Astin adopted during their marriage) and one biological (Mackenzie).

Astin married Valerie Ann Sandobal in 1989 and they live in Baltimore, Maryland. Astin is a vegetarian. He practices Nichiren Buddhism as a member of the worldwide Buddhist association Soka Gakkai International.

Filmography
Astin's film and television roles include:

Film

Television

References

External links

 
 
 
 John Astin at Turner Classic Movies
 
 
 
 
 John Astin at TV.com 
 John Astin at  MSN
 Article about John Astin's teaching work from the Johns Hopkins Gazette, "Course Catalog: Contemporary Theatre and Film: An Insider's View"; April 24, 2006 (Vol. 35 No. 31) (Includes contemporary picture of Astin)

1930 births
20th-century American male actors
21st-century American male actors
American Buddhists
American male film actors
American male stage actors
American male television actors
American male voice actors
American television directors
Johns Hopkins University alumni
Johns Hopkins University faculty
Nichiren Buddhists
Living people
Male actors from Baltimore
Members of Sōka Gakkai
Washington & Jefferson College alumni